Bennett/Berlin is an album by Tony Bennett, released in 1987 and recorded as a tribute to Irving Berlin.

Track listing
All songs written by Irving Berlin

 "They Say It's Wonderful" - 2:02
 "Isn't This a Lovely Day?" - 3:19
 "All of My Life" - 4:37
 "Now it Can Be Told" - 2:24
 "The Song is Ended (but the Melody Lingers On)" - 2:59
 "When I Lost You" - 1:13
 "Cheek to Cheek" - 3:25
 "Let Yourself Go" - 1:28
 "Let's Face the Music and Dance" - 1:55
 "Shaking the Blues Away" - 1:47
 "Russian Lullaby" - 2:11
 "White Christmas" - 3:05

Personnel
 Tony Bennett – vocals, arranger
 Dizzy Gillespie – trumpet (tracks 5 and 11)
 Dexter Gordon – saxophone (tracks 3 and 12) 
 Ralph Sharon – piano
 Paul Langosch – double bass
 George Benson – guitar (track 7)
 Joe LaBarbera – drums 

Production
 Danny Bennett – producer
 Tom Chiappa – production coordination
 Dae Bennett – engineer
 Paul Mufson
 Bob Ludwig – mastering
 Josephine DiDonato – artwork
 Annie Leibovitz – photography

1987 albums
Tony Bennett albums
Irving Berlin tribute albums
Columbia Records albums